Mohammed Amine Errafai (born 8 February 1989) is a Moroccan road cyclist. Born in the city of Taza, he started cycling in 2010 and he won many races in his region, he shine as a great and stronger cyclist in 2013/2014 when he moved to another club named "WAF" where he won multiple national races before he has been chosen to participate with the 3rd National Team in the 2014 Tour du Maroc.

In the 2014 National Championship Time Trial he finished in the 3rd place and in the National Road Championship he finished 13th.

Because of his great results, the Royal Moroccan Federation of Cycling chose him to participate with the 1st National Team at the 2014 UCI Road World Championships.

Major results

2014
 3rd Time trial, National Road Championships
 Challenge du Prince
3rd Trophée de la Maison Royale
6th Trophée de l'Anniversaire
6th Trophée Princier
2015
 La Tropicale Amissa Bongo
1st Combativity classification
1st Stage 6 (TTT)
 2nd Overall Tour du Faso
1st Stage 2
 2nd Grand Prix de Ben Guerir, Challenge des phosphates
 Les Challenges de la Marche Verte
4th GP Al Massira
6th GP Oued Eddahab
 Challenge du Prince
6th Trophée de l'Anniversaire
7th Trophée de la Maison Royale
8th Trophée Princier
 7th Overall Grand Prix Chantal Biya
 9th Overall Tour de Côte d'Ivoire
2016
 1st Overall Tour du Cameroun
1st Stage 1
 3rd  Team time trial, African Road Championships
 Challenge du Prince
6th Trophée de l'Anniversaire
7th Trophée de la Maison Royale

External links

Errafai Mohammed Amine at CQ ranking

1989 births
Living people
Moroccan male cyclists